Katy or KATY may refer to:

People and Characters
 Katy, a short form of the name Katherine
 Katy (given name)
 Katy (Marvel Cinematic Universe), a fictional character
 Katy Perry

Places

Serbia
 Kać, Serbia

United States
 Katy, Missouri, an unincorporated community
 Katy, Texas, the only incorporated U.S. city with this name
 Greater Katy, suburban region around the city of Katy; located in Greater Houston
 Katy High School
 Katy, West Virginia, an unincorporated community
 Katy Township, Boone County, Missouri
 Watertown Regional Airport (ICAO code: KATY), an airport in South Dakota

Art and entertainment
 Katy (series), a set of novels by Susan Coolidge
 Katy (novel), a children's novel by Jacqueline Wilson inspired by the series
 Katy (TV series), a TV adaptation of the Wilson novel
 Katy Fox, a character in Hollyoaks
 "K-K-K-Katy", a World War I-era song
 Katy (Marvel Cinematic Universe), a fictional character
 An ambulance in the film Ice Cold in Alex
 KATY-FM, a radio station of California, United States

Other uses
 Katy (apple), an apple variety
 Missouri–Kansas–Texas Railroad, sometimes called "the Katy", from which the above U.S. places take their name
 KATY-FM, a radio station of California, United States

Katies
Katies, the plural of "Katy", may refer to:

 Katies (1981–2004), a British Thoroughbred racehorse
 The Katies, a Tennessee powerpop band
 An Australia women's wear brand last owned by Miller's Retail

See also
 Katydid (disambiguation)
 
 Katie (disambiguation)
 Kati (disambiguation)
 Cati (disambiguation)
 KT (disambiguation)
 Kathi (disambiguation)
 Kathie
 Kąty (disambiguation)
 Cathie
 Cathy (given name)